Gator Tails (also released as Willis Jackson) is an album by saxophonist Willis Jackson with orchestra which was recorded in 1964 and released on the Verve label.

Reception

Allmusic awarded the album 3 stars.

Track listing 
All compositions by Willis Jackson except where noted.
 "I Almost Lost My Mind" (Ivory Joe Hunter) – 2:45   
 "The Crocodile" – 4:00   
 "On Broadway" (Barry Mann, Cynthia Weil, Jerry Leiber, Mike Stoller) – 2:23   
 "Swimmin' Home, Baby (Fruit Cake)" (Ben Tucker) – 2:15   
 "The Skillet" (Claus Ogerman) – 2:52   
 "Frankie and Johnny" (Traditional) – 4:18   
 "Someone to Watch Over Me" (George Gershwin, Ira Gershwin) – 4:10   
 "Lonesome Road" (Nathaniel Shilkret, Gene Austin) – 3:24   
 "Early One Morning (Part 2)" – 5:50  
Recorded in New York City on March 18, 1964 (tracks 4 & 9) and June 23, 1964 (tracks 1-3 & 5-8)

Personnel 
Willis Jackson – tenor saxophone
Robert Banks, Claus Ogerman – arranger, conductor
Unidentified Orchestra

References 

Willis Jackson (saxophonist) albums
1964 albums
Verve Records albums
Albums conducted by Claus Ogerman
Albums arranged by Claus Ogerman
Albums produced by Creed Taylor